State Highway 389 (SH 389) is a  state highway in Las Animas County, Colorado, United States, that connects New Mexico State Road 551 (NM 551) at the New Mexico state line with U.S. Route 160 (US 160), north of Branson.

Route description

SH 389 begins at the New Mexico border as the continuation of NM 551.

As the highway proceeds northward from Branson, valleys and hills surround the area and the Black Mesa comes into view. However, no mountains are visible.  

The Comanche National Grassland is nearby.

History
This routing was originally designated by the Colorado Department of Transportation as SH 100 (deleted) and as a portion of US 160. When US 160 was rerouted in 1949, the former portion was numbered as SH 389, today's number. Several years later, the section near NM 551 at the border was deleted, leaving the terminus at Branson. This section was re-added in 1964 and SH 389 was entirely paved a year later.

Major intersections

See also

 List of state highways in Colorado

References

External links

Transportation in Las Animas County, Colorado
389